Theo Breuer (15 March 1909 – 8 December 1980) was a German international footballer.

References

1909 births
1980 deaths
Association football forwards
German footballers
Germany international footballers
Fortuna Düsseldorf players
Fortuna Düsseldorf managers
German football managers
Footballers from Düsseldorf